Nick Tyrone is a journalist, novelist and writer who has published articles in The Spectator, Daily Express, The Independent, New Statesman. He has written several books including Dead Idol, Apocalypse Delayed: Why the Left is Still in Trouble, and Politics is Murder. He has been described by Jon Rentoul in The Independent as a "waspish writer and natural troublemaker".

Political career 
He was the Director of Operations and Finance as well as the Treasurer of the Yes to Fairer Votes campaign that sought (unsuccessfully) to change the UK voting system. Tyrone later told the story to the BBC that the campaign once considered putting inflatable replicas of MPs bottoms in order for the public to "kick".

For a period, he was the Executive Director of Centreforum, the think tank most known for the book The Orange Book: Reclaiming Liberalism which later became the Education Policy Institute. He left to join British Influence in the wake of the Brexit referendum in 2016.

He was a known member of the Liberal Democrats from 2008 to 2016, having subsequently written articles criticising the party.

He is currently an Associate Fellow at the think tank Bright Blue.

References

1972 births
Living people